The 2018 Badminton Asia Championships, was a badminton tournament which took place at Wuhan Sports Center Gymnasium in China from 24 to 29 April 2018 and has a total purse of $350,000.

Tournament
The 2018 Badminton Asia Championships is the 37th edition of the Badminton Asia Championships. This tournament was hosted by the Chinese Badminton Association, with the sanctioned from the Badminton Asia.

Venue
This international tournament was hold at Wuhan Sports Center Gymnasium in Wuhan, China.

Point distribution
This tournament is graded based on the BWF points system for the BWF World Tour Super 500 event. Below is the table with the point distribution for each phase of the tournament.

Prize money
The total prize money for this year tournament is US$350,000. Distribution of prize money is in accordance with BWF regulations.

Medal summary

Medalists

Medal table

Group stage

Men's singles

Seeds

 Srikanth Kidambi (quarterfinals)
 Son Wan-ho (quarterfinals)
 Chen Long (final)
 Shi Yuqi (second round)
 Lee Chong Wei (semifinals)
 Lin Dan (first round)
 Chou Tien-chen (quarterfinals)
 Ng Ka Long (quarterfinals)

Finals

Top half

Section 1

Section 2

Bottom half

Section 3

Section 4

Women's singles

Seeds

 Tai Tzu-ying (champion)
 Akane Yamaguchi (withdrew)
 P. V. Sindhu (quarterfinals)
 Ratchanok Intanon (second round)
 Nozomi Okuhara (first round)
 Chen Yufei (final)
 Sung Ji-hyun (semifinals)
 He Bingjiao (quarterfinals)

Finals

Top half

Section 1

Section 2

Bottom half

Section 3

Section 4

Men's doubles

Seeds

 Li Junhui / Liu Yuchen (champions)
 Liu Cheng / Zhang Nan (semifinals)
 Takeshi Kamura / Keigo Sonoda (final)
 Chen Hung-ling / Wang Chi-lin (first round)
 Lee Jhe-huei / Lee Yang (quarterfinals)
 Takuto Inoue / Yuki Kaneko (quarterfinals)
 Fajar Alfian / Muhammad Rian Ardianto (second round)
 Goh V Shem / Tan Wee Kiong (quarterfinals)

Finals

Top half

Section 1

Section 2

Bottom half

Section 3

Section 4

Women's doubles

Seeds

 Chen Qingchen / Jia Yifan (second round)
 Misaki Matsutomo / Ayaka Takahashi (final)
 Yuki Fukushima / Sayaka Hirota (champions)
 Shiho Tanaka / Koharu Yonemoto (first round)
 Greysia Polii / Apriyani Rahayu (quarterfinals)
 Lee So-hee / Shin Seung-chan (first round)
 Jongkolphan Kititharakul / Rawinda Prajongjai (quarterfinals)
 Du Yue / Li Yinhui (quarterfinals)

Finals

Top half

Section 1

Section 2

Bottom half

Section 3

Section 4

Mixed doubles

Seeds

 Tontowi Ahmad / Liliyana Natsir (final)
 Wang Yilü / Huang Dongping (champions)
 Tang Chun Man / Tse Ying Suet (quarterfinals)
 Seo Seung-jae / Kim Ha-na (first round)
 Zheng Siwei / Huang Yaqiong (semifinals)
 Goh Soon Huat / Shevon Jemie Lai (second round)
 Tan Kian Meng / Lai Pei Jing (first round)
 Dechapol Puavaranukroh / Sapsiree Taerattanachai (quarterfinals)

Finals

Top half

Section 1

Section 2

Bottom half

Section 3

Section 4

References

External links
 Tournament Link

Badminton Asia Championships
Asian Badminton Championships
Badminton
Badminton tournaments in China
International sports competitions hosted by China
2018 in Chinese sport
Sport in Wuhan
Badminton Asia Championships